Edwin Henry Galloway (April 12, 1825May 7, 1876) was an American businessman, Republican politician, and Wisconsin pioneer.

Biography
Edwin Galloway was born in Lewis County, New York, in 1825. He was raised on his father's farm and attended the district schools in that area. He finished his studies at the Lowville Academy, in Lowville, New York. After his education, he was hired as a clerk in a general store and worked there for two years.

He then became involved in the lumber trade, which was his principle business interest through the 1850s and 1860s.

He became involved in local affairs and politics and was elected mayor of Fond du Lac in 1860.  He also served as city treasurer, and was chairman of the  board of supervisors.  In 1862, he was elected to the Wisconsin State Assembly from  3rd Assembly district, running on the Republican Party ticket.  He was re-elected in 1863, and served in the 16th and 17th Wisconsin legislatures.

He retired from his lumber business in 1866 due to poor health.  He subsequently became a major shareholder and manager of the  Savings Bank.  He eventually became vice president of the bank, and held that position until his death in 1876.

He died at his home in  after a long illness.

Personal life and family
Edwin Galloway was a son of Charles and Anna ( Moore) Galloway.  Charles and Anna were married in England and emigrated to the United States in 1819.  Edwin's younger brother, Charles A. Galloway, became the 22nd mayor of Fond du Lac.

Edwin Galloway married Maria Henrietta Adams on October 30, 1849.  Maria Adams was a native of Lowville, New York.  The Galloways had five children, though one died in infancy.  Their only surviving son, Edwin A. Galloway, inherited and continued the family farm.

References

People from Lewis County, New York
Politicians from Fond du Lac, Wisconsin
Republican Party members of the Wisconsin State Assembly
Mayors of places in Wisconsin
Businesspeople in timber
American real estate businesspeople
American bankers
1825 births
1876 deaths
19th-century American politicians
19th-century American businesspeople